Gorlin may refer to:

People 
Dan Gorlin, computer game programmer, designer and founder of Dan Gorlin Productions
Eitan Gorlin, filmmaker, author and actor
Mikhail Gorlin, Russian emigre poet
Richard Gorlin, American cardiologist, co-developed the Gorlin equation
Robert J. Gorlin,  a professor and researcher at the University of Minnesota

In medicine 
Gorlin sign, the ability to touch the tip of the nose with the tongue and touch the elbow with the tongue
Gorlin syndrome, also known as basal cell nevus syndrome
The Gorlin equation, a method to calculate the effective area of a heart valve during cardiac catheterization